Paulin Sterkaj is a member of the Assembly of the Republic of Albania for the Democratic Party of Albania. Sterkaj moved to the Socialist Party of Albania.

References

Kush eshte Paulin Sterkaj

Living people
Democratic Party of Albania politicians
Members of the Parliament of Albania
Socialist Party of Albania politicians
21st-century Albanian politicians
Year of birth missing (living people)